Andonabe Sud is a rural municipality located in the Marolambo District, Atsinanana region of eastern Madagascar

References

mg:Andonabe Sud

Populated places in Atsinanana